Floyd Collins is a musical with music and lyrics by Adam Guettel, and book by Tina Landau. The story is based on the death of Floyd Collins near Cave City, Kentucky in the winter of 1925. The musical opened Off-Broadway on February 9, 1996, where it ran for 25 performances. There have been subsequent London productions as well as regional U.S. productions.

Productions
Floyd Collins premiered at the American Music Theater Festival, in Philadelphia, in 1994.

The show opened Off-Broadway at Playwrights Horizons, New York City, on February 9, 1996 and closed on March 24, 1996 after 25 performances. Directed by Landau, the cast included Christopher Innvar as Floyd Collins, Martin Moran as Skeets Miller, Jason Danieley as Homer Collins, and Theresa McCarthy as Nellie Collins, as well as Cass Morgan, Brian d'Arcy James, Matthew Bennett and Michael Mulheren.  The musical won the Lucille Lortel Award for Outstanding Musical, and the 1995-1996 Obie Award for its score.  In 2003, a reunion concert was held at Playwrights Horizons with Romain Frugé as Floyd Collins and most of the original cast.

After a three-stop mini US tour in 1999, including San Diego's Old Globe Theatre, Chicago's Goodman Theatre, and Philadelphia's American Music Theatre Festival, where it had first premiered; the show had its first independent regional production at New Line Theatre in St. Louis, Missouri, in November 1999.

The show made its London and European debut at the Bridewell Theatre in July 1999, with Nigel Richards as Floyd, Anna Francolini as Nellie and Craig Purnell as Homer. The highly acclaimed production was directed by Clive Paget. A London revival was produced at The Vault, Southwark Playhouse in February and March 2012. The production was directed by Derek Bond, with Glenn Carter as Floyd, Robyn North as Nellie, Gareth Chart as Homer and Ryan Sampson as Skeets. The production was produced by Peter Huntley and was long-listed for the Ned Sherrin Award for Best Musical at the Evening Standard Awards and won Best Musical Production at The Offies (Off West End Theatre Awards).

A Chicago revival was produced at BoHo Theatre in June and July 2012. The production was directed by Peter Marston Sullivan, with Jim DeSelm as Floyd, Jon Harrison as Homer, and Sarah Bockel as Nellie. Other regional productions include Actors Theatre of Louisville (2001), Carolina Actors Studio Theatre (2011), and Ophelia Theatre Group (2015).

Plot summary
As originally written, the character list included Floyd Collins, Homer Collins, Nellie Collins, and Johnnie Gerald; as rewritten the role of Johnnie Gerald was merged with that of Homer Collins.  As currently performed, the roles include Bee Doyle, Dr Hazlett, three reporters, a Con Man, Lee Collins, Homer Collins, Floyd Collins, Clif Rony, Jewlle Estes, Nellie Collins, Skeets Miller, Miss Jane, H. T. Carmichael and Ed Bishop.

Floyd Collins, exploring Sand Cave, uses the echoes of his voice to sound out the region, and falls through a tight passageway when his foot became trapped, wedged in position by a small rock. His family and his fellow cavers try to free him; when it becomes clear that his rescue will not be easy, his brother Homer spends the night in the cave with him. William Burke "Skeets" Miller, a small man, is able to squeeze through and visit with Floyd, relaying stories which were printed in the news.
Despite efforts by miners, the National Guard and the Red Cross, attempts at rescue fail, and the crowd grows outside the cave as a media circus ensues.

Seventeen days after Floyd had entered the cave, a shaft finally reaches him. He had died three days earlier.

The play's musical style is drawn from bluegrass, Americana, and "more complex musical forms that have their antecedents in the likes of Bartok, Janacek and Stravinsky".

Songs

Act I
 Ballad of Floyd Collins – Company
 The Call – Floyd
 It Moves – Floyd
 Time to Go – Floyd
 Lucky – Nellie and Miss Jane
 'Tween a Rock An' a Hard Place (replaced by "Where a Man Belongs" in 1999) – Family and locals
 Daybreak – Homer and Floyd
 Ballad of Floyd Collins (Reprise) – Jewell
 I Landed on Him – Skeets Miller
 And She'd Have Blue Eyes – Floyd
 Heart An' Hand – Miss Jane and Lee
 Riddle Song – Homer and Floyd

Act II
 Is That Remarkable? – reporters and company
 Carnival – Floyd and company
 Through the Mountain – Nellie
 Git Comfortable – Homer
 Ballad of Floyd Collins (2nd Reprise) – Jewell
 The Dream – Floyd, Nellie, Homer and company
 How Glory Goes – Floyd

Response
Despite having a run of only 25 performances, the show left a strong impression on contemporary theatre. John Simon, writing for New York Magazine, proclaimed that Floyd Collins was "the original and daring musical of our day." He also wrote that "Floyd Collins reestablishes America's sovereignty in a genre it created, but has since lost hold of: it is the modern musical's true and exhilarating ace in the hole." Reviewing a 2016 production, Terry Teachout, writing for the Wall Street Journal, called it "the finest work of American musical theater, not excluding opera, to come along since Stephen Sondheim’s Sweeney Todd".

Ben Brantley, in his review for The New York Times, wrote, "Mr. Guettel establishes himself as a young composer of strength and sophistication."

Recordings
The original cast recording was released by Nonesuch Records on March 18, 1997.

The following songs are not included on the recording: 
 "And She'd Have Blue Eyes"
 "The Ballad of Floyd Collins (reprise) (act 1)"
 "Where a Man Belongs"

The finale song is the title track of Audra McDonald's 2000 album How Glory Goes and was also included on Brian Stokes Mitchell's 2006 self-titled album and Kelli O'Hara's 2011 album Always.

References

External links
 
 1999 Los Angeles Times article about the writing of Floyd Collins
 2015 City Center interview with Jesse Eisenberg about Floyd Collins

1996 musicals
Off-Broadway musicals
Musicals inspired by real-life events
Obie Award-winning plays